Kuna High School is a public high school in Kuna, Idaho, the only traditional high school in the Kuna Joint School District #3, located in southwest Ada County, west of Boise and south of Meridian. The school colors are black and gold and the mascot is a Kaveman.

Athletics
Kuna competes in athletics in IHSAA Class 5A in the Southern Idaho Conference (5A) (SIC).

References

External links
 

Public high schools in Idaho
Schools in Ada County, Idaho
Treasure Valley